Liolaemus shitan is a species of lizard in the family Liolaemidae. It is native to Argentina.

References

shitan
Reptiles described in 2010
Reptiles of Argentina
Endemic fauna of Argentina
Taxa named by Cristian Simón Abdala
Taxa named by Andrés Sebastián Quinteros